The Carlson Criquet is an American, two-seats-in-tandem, high wing, strut-braced, single engine, homebuilt aircraft that was designed by Ernst W. Carlson and produced by Carlson Aircraft of East Palestine, Ohio in kit form. The prototype was completed in 1999.

The Criquet is a 3/4 scale replica of the German Second World War liaison aircraft, the  Fieseler Fi 156 Storch (English: Stork) and is named for the French post-war production model of the same aircraft, the Morane-Saulnier MS.505 Criquet.

Design and development
The Criquet has a 4130 steel tube frame fuselage, with the fuselage and wing all covered in doped fabric. The wings are supported by V-struts with jury struts. The landing gear is fixed and of conventional configuration. The Criquet was available as a kit that included a pre-welded fuselage.

Construction time from the kit is reported to be 1000 hours. Only one prototype, N22CA, was completed and it was destroyed in an accident on 24 May 2000 at East Palestine, Ohio, USA, with one fatality. The kit was no longer offered after 2005.

Specifications (Criquet)

See also

References

Homebuilt aircraft
Single-engined tractor aircraft
High-wing aircraft
STOL aircraft
Aircraft first flown in 1999
Replica aircraft